Jax Media is an American film and television production company co-founded by Tony Hernandez, Lilly Burns, and John Skidmore. It is known for producing long-running series Broad City, Difficult People, Younger, and Inside Amy Schumer.

In February 2018, Imagine Entertainment acquired a controlling stake in Jax Media.

Filmography

In production
Uncoupled (with Netflix) (2022)
 Partner Track (with Netflix) (2022)

Current television
 Inside Amy Schumer (with So Easy Productions, Irony Point, Comedy Partners and MTV Entertainment Studios) (2013–present)
 My Next Guest Needs No Introduction with David Letterman (with Worldwide Pants, RadicalMedia, and Zero Point Zero Production) (2018–present)
 The Conners (with Mohawk Productions and Werner Entertainment) (2018–present)
 The Other Two (with Broadway Video, Comedy Partners and MTV Entertainment Studios) (2019–present)
 Russian Doll (with Paper Kite Productions, 3 Arts Entertainment and Universal Television) (2019–present)
 A Black Lady Sketch Show (with 3 Arts Entertainment, Hoorae Media, and For Better or Words, Inc.) (2019–present)
 First Wives Club (with Paramount Television Studios and Tracy Yvonne Productions) (2019–present)
 South Side (with HBO Max) (2019–present)
 Emily in Paris (with Darren Star Productions and MTV Entertainment Studios) (2020–present)
 Haute Dog (with HBO Max) (2020–present)
 Wedding Season (with Disney Platform Distribution and Dancing Ledge Productions) (2022–present)
 Everyone Else Burns (with Universal International Studios) (2023–present)

Former television
 Broad City (with 3 Arts Entertainment, Paper Kite Productions and Comedy Partners) (2014–2019)
 The Jim Gaffigan Show (with Fedora Entertainment, Brillstein Entertainment Partners, Burrow Owl Productions, Chimichanga Productions, Inc., Sony Pictures Television, TV Land Original Productions) (2015–2016)
 Difficult People (with 3 Arts Entertainment, Paper Kite Productions and Universal Cable Productions) (2015–2017)
 Odd Mom Out (with Rottenberg-Zuritsky Productions, Piro Vision and Left/Right Productions) (2015–2017)
 Eye Candy (with Blumhouse Television and MTV Production Development) (2015)
 Younger (with Darren Star Productions and TV Land Original Productions) (2015–2021)
 Loosely Exactly Nicole (with 3 Arts Entertainment) (2016–2018)
 Search Party (with Quiet and Considerate Productions, Semi-Formal Productions. Inc and Studio T) (2016–2022)
 Full Frontal with Samantha Bee (with Randy & Pam's Quality Entertainment) (2016–2022)
 Netflix Presents: The Characters (with Netflix) (2016)
 The Detour (with TBS Productions, Randy & Pam's Quality Entertainment, Studio T and Nomadic Productions) (2016–2019)
 The Rundown with Robin Thede (with For Better or Words Inc. and Enterprises Inc.) (2017–2018)
 Nobodies (with On the Day Productions) (2017–2019)
 Roseanne (with Mohawk Productions and The Carsey-Werner Company) (2018)
 Living With Yourself (with Likely Story) (2019)
 Desus & Mero (with Bodega Boy's Original and Chopped Cheese) (2019–2022)
 Wilmore (with Universal Television) (2020)
 Chivalry (with Baby Cow Productions) (2022)
 The Pentaverate (with Netflix) (2022)

Films
 Top Five (with IAC Films and Scott Rudin Productions) (2014)
 A Very Murray Christmas (with American Zoetrope, Departed Productions and South Beach Productions) (2015)
 I Love You, Daddy (with Pig Newton, Inc.) (2017; unreleased)
 Fire Island (with Searchlight Pictures) (2022)
 Wedding Season (with Samosa Stories and Imagine Entertainment) (2022)

Specials
 I'm Brent Morin (with Netflix) (2015)
 Amy Schumer: Live at the Apollo (with HBO) (2015)
 Mike Birbiglia: Thank God for Jokes (with Netflix) (2017)
 John Mulaney: Kid Gorgeous at Radio City (with Netflix) (2018)
 Chris Rock: Tamborine (with Netflix) (2018)

References

External links
 Official website

American companies established in 2011
Film production companies of the United States
Imagine Entertainment
Mass media companies based in New York City
Mass media companies established in 2011
Television production companies of the United States
2011 establishments in New York City
2018 mergers and acquisitions